Richard Baines (born 3 August 1932) is a South African former cricketer. He played in three first-class matches for Border in 1952/53.

See also
 List of Border representative cricketers

References

External links
 

1932 births
Living people
South African cricketers
Border cricketers
Sportspeople from Qonce